Kwame Senu Neville Dawes (born 28 July 1962) is a Ghanaian poet, actor, editor, critic, musician, and former Louis Frye Scudder Professor of Liberal Arts at the University of South Carolina. He is now Professor of English at the University of Nebraska-Lincoln and editor-in-chief at Prairie Schooner magazine.

New York-based Poets & Writers named Dawes as a recipient of the 2011 Barnes & Noble Writers for Writers Award, which recognises writers who have given generously to other writers or to the broader literary community. In 2022, he was named "literary Person of the Year" by African literary blog Brittle Paper, an honour that "recognizes an individual who has done outstanding work in advancing the African literary industry and culture in the given year".

Biography

Early years and education
Kwame Dawes was born in Ghana in 1962 to Sophia and Neville Dawes, and in 1971 the family moved to Kingston, Jamaica, when Neville Dawes became deputy director of the Institute of Jamaica. Growing up in Jamaica, Kwame Dawes attended Jamaica College and the University of the West Indies at Mona, where he received a BA degree in 1983. He studied and taught in New Brunswick, Canada, on a Commonwealth Scholarship. In 1992 he earned a PhD in Comparative Literature from the University of New Brunswick, where he was editor-in-chief of the student newspaper, The Brunswickan.

Career
From 1992 to 2012 Dawes taught at the University of South Carolina (USC) as a Professor in English, Distinguished Poet in Residence, Director of the South Carolina Poetry Initiative, and Director of the USC Arts Institute. He was also the faculty advisor for the publication Yemassee. He won the 1994 Forward Poetry Prize, Best First Collection for Progeny of Air. He is currently a Chancellor's Professor of English and Editor-in-Chief of Prairie Schooner at the University of Nebraska-Lincoln, a faculty member of Cave Canem, and a teacher in the Pacific MFA program in Oregon.

Dawes collaborated with San Francisco-based writer and composer Kevin Simmonds on Wisteria: Twilight Songs from the Swamp Country, which debuted at London's Royal Festival Hall in 2006, and featured sopranos Valetta Brinson and Valerie Johnson.

In 2009, Dawes won an Emmy Award in the category of New Approaches to News & Documentary Programming: Arts, Lifestyle & Culture. His project documented HIV/AIDS in Jamaica, interspersed with poetry, photography by Andre Lambertson, and music by Kevin Simmonds. The website Livehopelove.com is the culmination of his project.
He is director of the Calabash International Literary Festival, a yearly event in Jamaica.

In 2012, the African Poetry Book Fund arose, with Dawes as the founding editor. He and five other internationally regarded poets serve on the reading board to annually publish the winning manuscript of the Sillerman First Book Prize for African Poets, a new and selected/collected volume by a major living African poet, the New-Generation African Poets Chapbook Boxset (comprising collected chapbooks of emerging writers, with special emphasis on those who have not yet published a full-length collection), and contemporary works of new poetry by select African poets (solicited and unsolicited manuscripts).

In 2018, Dawes was elected a Chancellor of the Academy of American Poets. In 2019 he was one of the eight recipients of the Windham-Campbell Prize, alongside Ishion Hutchinson (Jamaica), Danielle McLaughlin (Ireland), David Chariandy (Canada), Raghu Karnad (India), Rebecca Solnit (US), Young Jean Lee (US) and Patricia Cornelius (Australia).

In 2021 Dawes succeeded Ted Kooser as host of the news column American Life in Poetry.

Awards and honours
1994: Forward Poetry Prize (Best First Collection)
1996: Individual Artist Fellowship
2000: Poetry Business Prize
2000: Hollis Summers Poetry Prize
2001: Pushcart Prize for Poetry (US)
2003: Commonwealth Writers Prize (Caribbean and Canada Region, Best First Book)
2009: Emmy Award – New Approaches to News & Documentary Programming: Arts, Lifestyle & Culture
2019: Windham–Campbell Literature Prize in Poetry.
2022: Brittle Paper's Literary Person of the Year.

Works

Poetry
 Progeny of Air, Peepal Tree Press, 1994,  
 Resisting the Anomie, Fredericton, 1995,  
 Prophets, Peepal Tree Press, 1995,  
 Jacko Jacobus, Peepal Tree Press, 1996,  
 Requiem, Peepal Tree Press, 1996,  
 Shook Foil, Peepal Tree Press, 1997,  
 Map-Maker Smith/Doorstop Books, 2000,  
 
New and Selected Poems, 1994–2002, Peepal Tree Press, 2003,  
Bruised Totems, Parallel Press Madison, 2004,  
I Saw Your Face, with Tom Feelings, Dial Books, 2005, 
Wisteria: Twilight Songs from the Swamp Country, Red Hen Press, 2006,  
Impossible Flying, Peepal Tree Press, 2007,  
 
Hope's Hospice, Peepal Tree Press, 2009,  
Back of Mount Peace, Peepal Tree Press, 2009, 
Wheels, Peepal Tree Press, 2010, 
Duppy Conqueror: New and Selected Poems, Copper Canyon Press, 2013, 
Speak from Here to There, with John Kinsella, Peepal Tree Press, 2016,  
City of Bones: A Testament, Northwestern University Press, 2017,

Novels

Bivouac, Peepal Tree Press Ltd, 2010,

Short stories
 A Place to Hide and Other Stories, Peepal Tree Press, 2003,

Non fiction
Natural Mysticism: Towards a Reggae Aesthetic, Peepal Tree Press, 1999,  
 Bob Marley: Lyrical Genius, Sanctuary, 2002, 
A Far Cry from Plymouth Rock: A Personal Narrative, Peepal Tree Press, 2007,

Plays

Editor

(with Colin Channer) 

(with Jeremy Poynting) 

(with Marianne Kunkel and James Englehardt) 
(with Marjory Wentworth) 
(with Chris Abani) 
(With Chris Abani) 

(with Matthew Shenoda) 
(with Chris Abani) 
(with Chris Abani)

South Carolina Poetry Book Prize
Dawes established the South Carolina Poetry Initiative's annual book prize competition, and edits the winning manuscripts.

African Poetry Book Fund
Dawes is the founding editor of the African Poetry Book Fund (APBF). The series itself was started in 2014 and established through the generosity of Laura Sillerman and Robert F. X. Sillerman. The goal of the APBF is to promote and publicize "the poetic arts through its book series, contests, workshops, and seminars and through its collaborations with publishers, festivals, booking agents, colleges, universities, conferences and all other entities that share an interest in the poetic arts of Africa."

(Co-editor with Chris Abani) 
(with Chris Abani) 

(with Chris Abani) 
(with Chris Abani)

See also 

 Caribbean literature
 Caribbean poetry
 American literature

References

External links
Kwame Dawes & Pulitzer Center on Living and Loving with HIV in Jamaica
Kwame Dawes Homepage
Kwame Dawes biography on Poets.org

1962 births
20th-century Ghanaian poets
20th-century Jamaican poets
20th-century male writers
21st-century Ghanaian poets
21st-century Jamaican poets
21st-century male writers
Ghanaian male poets
Jamaican male poets
Literary critics of English
Living people
University of Nebraska–Lincoln faculty
University of New Brunswick alumni
University of South Carolina faculty
University of the West Indies alumni
Writers from South Carolina